Couiza is a commune in the Aude department in southern France.

Couiza is located at the foothills of the Pyrenees, on the road between Limoux, going towards Carcassonne and Quillan, going towards Perpignan. Couiza, in the upper valley of the Aude, is at the foot of the hill leading to  Rennes-le-Château.

Population

Sights
The Château de Couiza, a 16th-century castle, was built by the Dukes of Joyeuse and is  now a hotel and restaurant (Les Ducs de Joyeuse). There is also a good tourist office, another restaurant, two patisseries and a post office.  There is also a church in Couiza dedicated to St. Jean the Baptist. The area around Couiza is rich in historic and geographic interest.

Transportation
The railway line from Carcassonne runs here stopping in Limoux and Espéraza on the way but the service is limited. Leaving Couiza the main road (D117) leads to Perpignan. Down to Barcelona or up to Narbonne and the TGV lines across the South of France.

See also
Communes of the Aude department

References

External links

Official website for Couiza (in French)
Activities in and around Couiza, plus holiday accommodation

Communes of Aude
Aude communes articles needing translation from French Wikipedia